At Peace (stylised as @peace) was a New Zealand hip hop group.  The group comprised lyricist and vocalist Tom Scott, also of the hip-hop group Home Brew; lyricist and vocalist Lui Tuiasau, formerly of hip-hop duo Nothing To Nobody; and producers Christoph El Truento, Dandruff Dicky and B Haru.

At Peace released three albums between 2012 and 2014 before the group's breakup in 2015. The group's debut album, @Peace, was nominated for the Taite Music Prize in 2013.

In 2014 they released a song which included lyrics threatening to kill John Key and have sex with his daughter. In 2018 Scott said "I was wrong. I could’ve definitely done that better.”

Discography
Studio albums
@Peace (2012) No. 11 NZ
Girl Songs (2013) No. 12 NZ
@Peace and the Plutonian Noise Symphony (2014) No. 3 NZ

Other appearances

References

External links

 At Peace on Bandcamp

New Zealand hip hop groups
Musical groups established in 2011
Musical quintets
2011 establishments in New Zealand